A-sharp minor is a minor musical scale based on A, consisting of the pitches A, B, C, D, E, F, and G. Its key signature has seven sharps.

Its relative major is C-sharp major (or enharmonically D-flat major). Its parallel major, A-sharp major, is usually replaced by B-flat major, since A-sharp major's three double-sharps make it impractical to use. The direct enharmonic equivalent of A-sharp minor is B-flat minor, which has five flats.

A-sharp minor is likely the least used minor key in music as it is not generally considered a practical key for composition. The enharmonic equivalent B-flat minor, which only contains five flats as opposed to A-sharp minor's seven sharps, is preferable to use.

The A-sharp natural minor scale is:

Changes needed for the melodic and harmonic versions of the scale are written in with accidentals as necessary. The A-sharp harmonic minor and melodic minor scales are:

In Christian Heinrich Rinck's 30 Preludes and Exercises in all major and minor keys, Op. 67, the 16th Prelude and Exercise is in A-sharp minor. In Bach's Prelude and Fugue in C-sharp major, BWV 848, a brief section near the beginning of the piece modulates to A-sharp minor.

External links 
 Overview of compositions with 7 accidentals

Musical keys
Minor scales